Volleyball was contested for men only at the 1930 Central American and Caribbean Games in Havana, Cuba.

References
 

1930 Central American and Caribbean Games
1930
1930 in volleyball
International volleyball competitions hosted by Cuba